Betta pi is a species of gourami belonging to the genus Betta. It can be found in the Western Pacific Ocean in Malaysia and Thailand. It is primarily found in well shaded peat forest blackwater swamps and creeks. It is benthopelagic.

References

pi
Freshwater fish of Malaysia
Taxa named by Heok Hui Tan
Fish described in 1998